Yugoslavia competed at the 1987 Mediterranean Games held in Latakia, Syria.

Medalists

External links
Yugoslavia at the 1987 Mediterranean Games at the Olympic Museum Belgrade website
1987 Official Report at the International Mediterranean Games Committee

Nations at the 1987 Mediterranean Games
1987
Mediterranean Games